Mary Pierce was the defending champion, but lost to  Ai Sugiyama in the second round.

Nathalie Tauziat won the title, defeating Barbara Schett in the final 2–6, 6–4, 6–1.

Seeds
The top four seeds received a bye to the second round.

Draw

Finals

Top half

Bottom half

Qualifying

Seeds

Qualifiers

Lucky loser
  Kimberly Po

Qualifying draw

First qualifier

Second qualifier

Third qualifier

Fourth qualifier

External links
 Kremlin Cup Draw

Kremlin Cup
Kremlin Cup